Thapsic acid (hexadecanedioic acid) is a naturally occurring dicarboxylic acid with the formula 
C16H30O4.  The name is derived from Thapsia, the Latin name for a Mediterranean perennial whose roots contain thapsic acid.

It has a role as a human metabolite. It is the conjugate acid of hexadecanedioate.

References

Dicarboxylic acids